The Hemlock Bridge is a covered bridge in a rural part of Fryeburg, Maine.  Built in 1857, it carries Hemlock Bridge Road over the Old Course Saco River, near the western shore of Kezar Lake in eastern Fryeburg.  It is the last surviving 19th-century covered (of seven built) in Fryeburg.  It was listed on the National Register of Historic Places in 1970 and designated as a Maine Historic Civil Engineering Landmark by the  American Society of Civil Engineers in 2002.

Description
The Old Course Saco River, which the bridge spans, is a remnant of the original course of the Saco River, which was bypassed by canal-digging in the early 19th century.

The bridge was one of seven covered bridges erected in Fryeburg in the 19th century, all crossing the Saco River, whose original course meandered across the plain in a nearly circular arc.  In 1815 local residents successfully petitioned the state to bypass this large meander which locals described as "thirty-six miles of river and six miles of country".  At this time five bridges crossed the Saco; the Hemlock Bridge was built in 1857.  It is the last of the seven bridges still standing.  It is maintained by the state.

See also

National Register of Historic Places listings in Oxford County, Maine
List of bridges on the National Register of Historic Places in Maine
List of Maine covered bridges

References

Covered bridges on the National Register of Historic Places in Maine
Bridges completed in 1857
Bridges in Oxford County, Maine
Fryeburg, Maine
National Register of Historic Places in Oxford County, Maine
Road bridges on the National Register of Historic Places in Maine
1857 establishments in Maine
Wooden bridges in Maine
Long truss bridges in the United States